Steve Marshall (born 13 April 1960) is a Canadian wrestler. He competed in the men's Greco-Roman 100 kg at the 1988 Summer Olympics.

References

1960 births
Living people
Canadian male sport wrestlers
Olympic wrestlers of Canada
Wrestlers at the 1988 Summer Olympics
Sportspeople from New Westminster
Pan American Games medalists in wrestling
Pan American Games bronze medalists for Canada
Wrestlers at the 1987 Pan American Games
Medalists at the 1987 Pan American Games
20th-century Canadian people